Qaleh-ye Rostam may refer to:
 Qaleh-ye Rostam, Lorestan
 Qaleh-ye Rostam, Sistan and Baluchestan